Line 2 of the Changsha Metro is a rapid transit line running from west to east Changsha crossing the Xiang River. The Phase 1 of the line was opened on 29 April 2014 with 19 stations, and the western extension opened on 28 December 2015 with 4 stations. This line is 26.57 km long with 23 stations.

Opening timeline

Stations (west to east)

Future
An extension is planned that would see the line extended from its current western terminus, north to the under construction Changsha West railway station. The feasibility study for this project was approved in January 2021.

References

Changsha Metro lines
2014 establishments in China
Railway lines opened in 2014